Philip Marsh (born 23 October 1994) is a British épée fencer and former junior world champion. His clubs are Brixton Fencing Club and Grenoble Parmentier.

He participated at the 2011 Junior World Fencing Championships for the United Kingdom, winning the gold medal. In addition, he has competed for the United Kingdom at numerous World Cups, winning a silver medal in Gothenburg, Sweden, in 2012.

In 2011, he won the épée title at the British Fencing Championships.

References

External links

British male épée fencers
1994 births
Living people